The cinereous bulbul (Hemixos cinereus) is a species of songbird in the bulbul family, Pycnonotidae. It is found in Southeast Asia and Indonesia.

Taxonomy and systematics
The cinereous bulbul was originally classified in the genus Iole. It was formerly considered as conspecific with the ashy bulbul.

Subspecies
Two subspecies are currently recognized:
 H. c. cinereus - (Blyth, 1845): Found on the Malay Peninsula and Sumatra
 Green-winged bulbul (H. c. connectens) - Sharpe, 1887: Formerly described as a separate species by some authorities. Found in northern Borneo

References

cinereous bulbul
Birds of Southeast Asia
cinereous bulbul
cinereous bulbul